Luis Saguar (October 6, 1957 – July 8, 2009) was an  American writer, professor and actor in theater and films. Saguar played characters as diverse as wise elders, terrifying addicts, and strange sidekicks. He was also co-founder of Campo Santo, the theater company at the Intersection for the Arts. He is especially known for his work in 8mm, Fun with Dick and Jane and Flawless films, and his theater work in "Santos & Santos" (work directed by Octavio Solis), playing one of the corrupt lawyer brothers.

Biography
Saguar was born in San Francisco, California, and was raised in Daly City, California. He had three siblings: Pablo Saguar, Frank Arambarri and Gloria Flore. During his adolescence, Saguar began using drugs, and at 15 was jailed for participating in a robbery. He turned his life around when he began his acting career at almost 30.  In 2001, he published his work "Angulo Hotel", in which he spoke of living on the streets and explaining the risks of drugs and crime.

He played many different roles in theater, among which highlight their works in Shakespeare and Sartre. He acted on many stages in the Bay Area, Magic Theatre, American Conservatory Theater, Theatreworks USA, and  ELTeatro Campesino. He also participated in 20 films (among them The Zodiac, and Fun with Dick and Jane), and many TV shows (among them The Shield, Nash Bridges and Midnight Caller). Saguar died on July 8, 2009 at Seton Medical Center in Daly City, at the age of 51.

Personal life
He married Nancy Landolina  and they had an only child, a daughter named Carmela.

Filmography

Films
 1999: 8mm - Manny
 1999: Flawless -  Mr. Z
 2001: Echos of Enlightenment - Rabbi Don Carlos White Wolf
 2002:  The Three-Cornered Hat (Short) - Pirate
 2004: Quality of Life - Pops
 2004: Happily Even After - Casper
 2004: Silver City - Vince Esparza
 2005: Tweek City - Chucho
 2005: The Zodiac - Sammy Karzoso (as Luis Sagua)
 2005: Fun with Dick and Jane - Hector
 2006: Read You Like a Book
 2007: Coyote and the Ten Gallon Hat (Short)  - Miguel
 2008: Bottle Shock - Man #1 (as Louis Saguar)
 2008: Pig Hunt - T.J.
 2009: Everything Strange and New - Manny
 2009: Night Fliers - Mr. Jordan
 2009: The Mercy Man - Tattooed Guard
 2011: Political Animals - Pedro

TV
 1991: Midnight Caller -  "Uninvited Guests" episode (1991): as Felipe Salazar
 1992: America's Most Wanted - Stabler's Accomplice (segment "William Stabler Jr.") - Folsom Prison (1992): as Stabler's Accomplice (segment "William Stabler Jr.")
 1996: Dalva
 1996: Grand Avenue (TV film) - as a Bartender
 1996-1999: Nash Bridges - "Smash and Grab" episode (1999): Lou Ortiz; "Apocalypse Nash" episode (1998): Enrique Piedra; "Hit Parade" episode (1996): as Frank LaPlante
 2002: The Shield - "Two Days of Blood" episode (2002): as Pazi Arambula
 2004: Karen Sisco - "He Was a Friend of Mine" episode (2004): as Cano
 2006: The Evidence - "Pilot" (2006): as a hippie vendor
 2006: Nip/Tuck - "Merrill Bobolit" (2006) ... as the Federal Correction Officer #1
 2007: Day Break - "What If It's Him?" (2007) and "What If He's Free?"  (2007)

Video game
 1996: The Crystal Skull

References

External links

 In Memory of Luis: October 6, 1956 - July 8, 2009

Male actors from California
1957 births
2009 deaths